Varanasi Graduates constituency is one of a hundred Legislative Council seats in Uttar Pradesh. This constituency covers Varanasi, Mirzapur, Ghazipur, Ballia, Chandauli, Sant Ravidas Nagar and Sonebhadra districts.

Members of Legislative Council

See also
Varanasi Cantonment (Assembly constituency)
Varanasi (Lok Sabha constituency)

References
http://indiaelectionresults.in/2014/03/27/mlc-election-result-2014-mlc-lucknow-jhansi-allahabad-election-result/

Uttar Pradesh Legislative Council
Graduates constituencies in India